The Jedediah Smith Memorial Trail (or American River Bike Trail) is a paved multi-use pathway that runs between the confluence of the Sacramento River with the American River, just north of downtown Sacramento, California, and Beal's Point at Folsom Lake, north of Folsom. The trail is considered one of the longest paved purpose-built bike trails in the country. The trail is maintained by the County of Sacramento and is painted with mile markers placed at every half-mile increment.

History

In the early 19th century, the famous fur trapper Jedediah Smith explored the area east of Sacramento, between the settlement at the confluence now known as Old Sacramento, and Folsom. The area follows the course of the American River, and is rich in a diversity of wildlife. In the late 19th century, the trail was marked out by a prototype cycling organization, The Capital City Wheelmen, but was soon abandoned as a viable commuter artery with the onset of automobiles in the early 20th century. The trail fell into disrepair until it was reexamined as a transportation route by cyclists in the 1970s, when the pathway was paved.  A section of the trail was later added that runs along the south side of Lake Natoma and into downtown Folsom.

The trail is used by approximately 5 million people annually.

Notable landmarks and attractions

The trail passes several places of interest between Sacramento and Folsom. The recreational areas of Discovery Park, Sutter's Landing Park (the point at which John Sutter, founder of Sacramento and notable area entrepreneur, first arrived), the Guy West Bridge (a scaled down reproduction of San Francisco's Golden Gate Bridge), California State University, Sacramento (or, more commonly, Sacramento State), William B. Pond Recreation Area, River Bend Park, the Fair Oaks walking bridge, the Nimbus Fish Hatchery, Lake Natoma and Folsom Lake.

The trail runs through various parks and untouched areas, inhabited by a variety of animals. Throughout the trail, animals such as deer, western rattlesnakes, and woodpeckers can be found amongst others. As of 2020, coyotes are becoming more common along the trail, and are increasingly acclimated to the presence of people.

References

External links

 
Google map showing the trail
http://www.arpf.org/
http://railstotrails.us/ca-american-river-bike-trail.html
http://activities.wildernet.com/pages/area.cfm?areaid=CASAJS&cu_id=157
https://web.archive.org/web/20060901151326/http://www.saccycle.com/bikewaymaps/map6.htm

Bike paths in California
Hiking trails in California
American River (California)
Protected areas of Sacramento County, California
Transportation in Sacramento County, California
National Recreation Trails in California